Shays Creek is a stream in northeastern Madison County in the U.S. state of Missouri. It is a tributary of Village Creek.

Shays Creek bears the name of a pioneer citizen.

See also
List of rivers of Missouri

References

Rivers of Madison County, Missouri
Rivers of Missouri